James Bowen (born 4 February 1996) is an English footballer who plays for Southern League Division One Central side Halesowen Town, where he plays as a left back, he can also be deployed as a winger.

Playing career
Bowen began his career with Cheltenham Town, progressing through the club's youth setup. In the 2013 summer he was loaned to Bishop's Cleeve, appearing regularly during his spell.

On 28 March 2014 Bowen was loaned to Evesham United in a work experience deal. He made his debut for the club on 2 April, scoring a brace and providing an assist in a 4–0 home win against North Leigh.

On 1 July 2014 Bowen signed his first professional deal. On 15 November he made his professional debut, starting in a 1–5 away loss against Stevenage.

Prior to the 2015/16 campaign he joined Conference North club Gloucester City on loan until January. On 9 December 2015 it was announced that his contract will not be renewed at the end of the season. On 22 February Bowen joined Midland Football League side Hereford on an initial one-month loan deal.

After leaving Hereford he signed for Stafford Rangers, spending a season there before rejoining Hereford again for the start of the 2017–18 campaign.

On 23 February 2019, Bowen left National League North side Leamington, and joined Southern League Premier Central side Redditch United.

Statistics

References

External links

1996 births
Living people
Sportspeople from Worcester, England
English footballers
Association football defenders
Cheltenham Town F.C. players
Bishop's Cleeve F.C. players
Evesham United F.C. players
Gloucester City A.F.C. players
Hereford F.C. players
Stafford Rangers F.C. players
Solihull Moors F.C. players
Leamington F.C. players
Redditch United F.C. players
Halesowen Town F.C. players
English Football League players